Automaniac is a TV show hosted by former professional wrestler Bill Goldberg. In each episode, Goldberg told the story of a particular type of vehicle: its origins, its designers, etc. The show aired on Wednesdays at 11 PM EST/10 PM CST on The History Channel and was canceled in August 2005.

External links 
 The History Channel page for Automaniac

Automotive television series
History (American TV channel) original programming